Koleḻuttu, popularly romanised as Kolezhuthu (കോലെഴുത്ത്), was a syllabic alphabet of Kerala used for writing Malayalam language.

Kolezhuthu developed from Vattezhuthu script in the post-Chera Perumal (c. 12th century onwards) period in Kerala. It was used by certain Kerala communities (such as Muslims and Christians) even up to c. 18th century AD.

Kolezhuthu probably gets its name from a peculiar type of stylus which was used for its writing. Kol in present-day Malayalam means a stylus or an elongated stick-like object, and ezhuthu means 'written form'.

References

Malayalam language
Brahmic scripts